Sousa is a noble family of Portugal.

History 
The descendants are of the marriage of Martim Afonso Chichorro and Inês Lourenço de Sousa.

It is one of the eldest and nobler houses of Portugal. Its origin starts with the Visigoth  Kings and the name was first used in the 11th century, by Lord Egas Gomes de Sousa, heir to the house and to several royal lineages. There are three main lineages of this noble house, but we shall only focus on the one represented to left (Sousa of Arronches).

The family head is the Duke of Lafões. Some say that there isn't a single noble man (or woman) in Portugal that does not have the blood of the Sousas. The first recorded spelling of the family name is shown to be that of Garcia Homem de Sousa, which was dated 1420, christened at Funchal, Portugal, during the reign of King John I of Portugal. The House of Sousa played a significant role in the creation of the Portuguese Empire. Martim Afonso de Sousa was the first captain - major of Brazil ("capitão-mor da armada e da terra do Brasil", with powers equivalent to those of a governor), Tomé de Sousa was the first formal Governor General of Brazil, Pedro Lopes de Sousa was the 1st Governor of Portuguese Ceylon and Thome de Sousa Arronches was a Captain of the Portuguese Navy in the Portuguese India Armadas.

The family motto (Better to break than to bend).

Lords of the House of Sousa

 D. Sueiro Belfaguer (875-925) - the 1st Lord of the House of Sousa.
 D. Egas Gomes de Sousa (1035 -?)
 D. Mem Viegas de Sousa (1070 - 1130)
 D. Gonçalo Mendes de Sousa, "the good" (1120 – 1190)
 D. Mendo de Sousa, "the sousão" (1140 -1197)
 D. Constança Mendes de Sousa (1245 - Santarém, 1298)
 D. Martim Afonso Chichorro (1250-1313)
 D. Martim Afonso Chichorro II or Martin Afonso de Sousa Chichorro (1280 -?)
 D. Maria Pais Ribeira, 15ª Lady of House of Sousa * c. 1285
 D. Vasco Martins de Sousa Chichorro (1320 - 1387)
 D. Lopo Dias de Sousa, Lord of Mafra, Ericeira and Enxara dos Cavaleiros * 1350
 D. Afonso Vasques de Sousa (1370)
 Diogo Lopes de Sousa, 18º Lord of House of Sousa * c. 1380
 D.Afonso Vasques de Sousa II (1400),
 Álvaro de Sousa, Lord of Miranda e mayor of Arronches * c. 1410
 D. Luis de Sousa Chichorro (1440)
 Diogo Lopes de Sousa * c. 1440
 André de Sousa * c. 1465
 D. Henrique de Sousa (1480)
 Manuel de Sousa, mayor of Arronches * c. 1495
 André de Sousa, 23º Lord of House of Sousa * c. 1515
 D. António de Sousa Chichorro (1520)
 Manuel de Sousa
 D. Matias de Sousa (1550)
 Diogo Lopes de Sousa, 2nd Count of Miranda * c. 1595
 D. Pedro de Sousa Chichorro
 Henrique de Sousa Tavares, first Marquis of Arronches * 1626
 D. Maria de Sousa e Mesquita
 D. António Sousa Chíchorro  balio "ad honorem".
 Mariana Luísa Francisca de Sousa Tavares Mascarenhas e Silva, 2nd Marquess of Arronches * 1672
 Luísa Casimira de Sousa Nassau and Ligne, duchess of Lafões * 1694

Coat of arms
The field of the shield is divided in four quarters (quarterly or party per cross) with the royal arms of Portugal in the first and fourth quarters, and the arms of Sousa, a quartet of silver crescents (Argent) over a field of red (Gules), in the second and third quarters. This grouping known as the Sousa of Arronches (because of the title of Lords of Arronches), is still borne by many of the noble houses of Portugal, like the Dukes of Palmela.

References

 Manuel Abranches de Soveral,http://www.soveral.info/mas/Souza%20do%20Prado.htm
 D. António Caetano de Sousa, História Genealógica da Casa Real Portuguesa, Atlântida-Livraria Editora, Lda, 2ª Edição, Coimbra, 1946. Tomo I-pg. 142.
 José João da Conceição Gonçalves Mattoso, Ricos-Homens, Infanções e Cavaleiros,  Guimarães Editores, 3ª Edição, Lisboa, 1998, pg. 47

Portuguese noble families